Dr. Ralph L. Buice, Jr. Observatory is an astronomical observatory owned and operated by the Fernbank Science Center. It is located between Decatur and Atlanta, Georgia (USA).  The observatory owns a  Cassegrain telescope housed beneath a  dome.

See also 
List of observatories

References

External links

 Fernbank Observatory Clear Sky Clock Forecasts of observing conditions.

1967 establishments in Georgia (U.S. state)
Astronomical observatories in Georgia (U.S. state)
Buildings and structures in DeKalb County, Georgia
Tourist attractions in DeKalb County, Georgia
Education in DeKalb County, Georgia